Juvenal was a poet.

Juvenal or Juvenals may also refer to:
 Juvenal (name), and persons with the name
 Juvenals, a student society
 An immature bird